Richard of Wallingford (1292–1336) was an English mathematician, astronomer, horologist, and cleric who made major contributions to astronomy and horology while serving as abbot of St Albans Abbey in Hertfordshire.

Biography
Richard was born, the son of a blacksmith, at Wallingford in Berkshire (now Oxfordshire) in England in 1292. When he was orphaned he was taken to William de Kirkeby the Prior of Wallingford Priory and dedicated to the Holy Trinity. (Wallingford was a dependant priory to S Albans Abbey) Richard subsequently spent six years studying at Oxford University before becoming a monk at St Albans. He later studied for nine more years at Oxford. In 1327 he became abbot of St Albans.

Richard of Wallingford is best known for the astronomical clock he designed, while he was abbot, which is described in the Tractatus Horologii Astronomici (1327). The clock was completed about 20 years after Richard's death by William of Walsham but was apparently destroyed during Henry VIII's reformation and the dissolution of St Albans Abbey in 1539. His clock almost certainly was the most complex clock mechanism in existence at the time in the British Isles, and one of the most sophisticated ones anywhere. The only other clocklike mechanism of comparable complexity that is documented in the 14th century is the astrarium by Giovanni de Dondi. Richard’s clock gave the mean time in equal and unequal hours, as well as the true solar time. It also displayed the phases of the moon and showed the positions of the lunar nodes and the height of tide at London Bridge. 

Based on the 14th-century literary evidence still surviving in the 20th century, several scholars of horological history have tried to build recreations of Richard of Wallingford's clock.  The best known of these was built by Haward Horological and for many years was displayed at the Time Museum (now defunct) in Rockford, Illinois; it is currently on display at the Halim Time and Glass Museum in Evanston, Illinois. One was built by Eric Watson and is now in the Wallingford Museum; one built in 1988 is located at St Albans Cathedral; and one was built by Don Unwin for the Whipple Museum of the History of Science in Cambridge.

Richard suffered from what was then thought to be leprosy (although it might have been scrofula or tuberculosis) which he apparently contracted when he went to have his position as abbot of St Albans Abbey confirmed by the Pope at Avignon. He died at St Albans in 1336.

Studies in astronomy and mathematics 
Richard also designed and constructed calculation devices: a torquetum, the Rectangulus, and an equatorium, which he called Albion. The Albion could be used for astronomical calculations such as lunar, solar and planetary longitudes and could predict eclipses, and was capable of doing this without relying on a set of tables that had to be copied out. This is described in the Tractatus Albionis. He published other works on trigonometry, celestial coordinates, astrology, and various religious works.

See also

Giovanni Dondi dell'Orologio
Yi Xing
Su Song

References

North, J. (2004) God's Clockmaker: Richard of Wallingford and the Invention of Time. Oxbow Books. 
North, J. (1976) Richard of Wallingford – Volume I Texts and Translations,  Volume II – The Life of Richard of Wallingford – Introductions and Commentaries to Text, Volume III – Illustrations, Tables, Appendices, Glossaries, Bibliography and Indexes; An edition of his writings, with introductions, English translation and commentary, Oxford Univ Press. 
Watson, E (1979) The St Albans Clock of Richard of Wallingford. Antiquarian Horology, Number 4, Volume 11, Summer 1979, p. 372–384.

External links 

 The Astronomical Clock of Richard of Wallingford
 Images of Richard of Wallingford and the Astronomical Clock of Richard of Wallingford from the British Library
 Wallingford History Gateway
 Royal Berkshire History: Richard of Wallingford

1292 births
1336 deaths
14th-century astrologers
14th-century English mathematicians
14th-century English Roman Catholic priests
Abbots of St Albans
English clockmakers
Horology
Medieval English astrologers
Medieval English astronomers
People from Wallingford, Oxfordshire
Catholic clergy scientists
14th-century English astronomers
14th-century Latin writers